Luis Venegas (born March 13, 1979) is a Spanish editor and publisher of five independent, limited edition magazines: Fanzine137, EY! Magateen, Candy, The Printed Dog and EY! Boy. He is also a creative director who has worked with luxury brands such as Loewe, Acne, Carolina Herrera and J.W.Anderson.

Early career

Luis' career started in Paris in 1996 when he was working as a designer for Thierry Mugler. In 1999, he moved to Madrid to work for Spanish fashion designer Sybilla as Creative Director of Communications until 2005.

Fanzine137
In 2004, the first issue of Fanzine137 was born, with a limited edition run of 1,137 copies. The magazine is a collection of Luis Venegas’ objects of attraction at the specific time of publication.

Every issue is unique in size, theme, materials, layout and graphic design changes.
The list of contributors of Fanzine137 has included Steven Klein, Terry Richardson, Alasdair McLellan, Ryan McGinley, Christian Lacroix, Javier Vallhonrat, Tom Ford, Rodarte, Richard Prince, Tim Walker, Larry Clark, Gus Van Sant, plus interviews with  Linda Evangelista, Bruce Weber, Juergen Teller, Carolina Herrera, Joe McKenna, Grace Coddington and Oliver Zahm among others. It has also posthumously presented portfolios by photographers such as Richard Avedon, Helmut Newton, Herb Ritts and Francesco Scavullo.

EY! Magateen
Venegas launched his second magazine, EY! Magateen in Spring 2008. The magazine was originally called Electric Youth!. The title of the magazine makes homage to Debbie Gibson’s 1989 song Electric Youth,  taken from the album with the same name.
EY! Magateen addresses the energy, power and vitality of young males, most of them aged between 16 and 21 years. Each new issue is about a specific country or a city and is limited to just 1000 copies. The group of young people on display in EY! Magateen is a mix of handsome unknowns: mostly models, emerging artists, actors and athletes. The magazine features quirky comments and suggestive nudity.

Issues 6, 7 and 8 featured collaborations with American Apparel.

Candy

Venegas’ third magazine, Candy was launched in October 2009. According to its slogan it is The First Transversal Style Magazine. Following the tradition of his other two magazines, Candy has an exclusive limited edition run of 1500 copies. It is a fashion and art magazine completely dedicated to celebrating transvestism, trans-sexuality, crossdressing and androgyny. The title of the magazine makes homage to Candy Darling.

Unlike other publications related to the LGBT community, which generally advocate for rights form a political standpoint, Candy stands out as a celebration of this lifestyle. For Venegas, “Candy isn't about rights, but I do think the fact it [Candy] exists helps.”  In an interview with The New York Times, Venegas made his statement clear:

Photographers like Bruce Weber, Terry Richardson, Steven Klein, Tim Walker, David Armstrong, Ellen von Unwerth, Ryan McGinley, Walter Pfeiffer, Juan Gatti, Daniel Riera or Danielle Levitt and writers like Tim Blanks, Derek Blasberg or Hilton Als -among others- are regular contributors.

For the launch of the second issue, Venegas collaborated with Swedish design house Acne, creating a limited run of unisex blouses named after characters from the American soap opera, Dynasty.

Issues 1, 2, 3, 4, 6, and 8 had a single cover printed, with the 8th issue's being a gatefold cover. All other issues had multiple different covers, some featuring the same person on the cover (issues 5 and 9, featuring Connie Flemming and Miley Cyrus, respectively), others with different people on each different cover (issues 10 onwards). For issues 9 through 13, the number of different covers matches the issue number.

In 2020 Venegas edited THE C☆NDY BOOK OF TRANSVERSAL CREATIVITY celebrating the 10th anniversary of the magazine. With the subtitle THE BEST OF C☆NDY TRANSVERSAL MAGAZINE, ALLEGEDLY, the book is a compilation that includes photography and art from over 100 artists from the first 12 issues, as well as new writings reflecting on the magazine's cultural impact.

Other Projects 
Invited by Christian Lacroix in 2008 he was a judge for the prestigious photography festival Rencontres d’Arles alongside Elisabeth Biondi, Caroline Issa & Masoud Golsorkhi, Nathalie Ours and Carla Sozzani.

As a Creative Director in Spring 2012 he directed a video for the launch of Loewe’s Oro Collection which became popular and highly controversial in Spain. As a result, the collection sold out and it turned out to be the best seller of the year for the LVMH's Spanish brand.

In 2013 he took part as a panelist for a Fashion Seminar in Helsinki curated by Daniel Thawley in which also participated Marc Ascoli, Michel Gaubert, Jonathan Anderson, Benjamin Bruno and Karen van Godtsenhoven held at the Aalto University.

Venegas has also DJ’d in various venues around the world including Plastic in Milan, George & Dragon and Bistrotheque in London, Razzmatazz in Barcelona, Kaiku in Helsinki and at the Boom Boom Room in New York City.

He occasionally is a professor in Madrid and Barcelona.

References

External links
 By Luis Venegas website
 Luis Venegas's Vimeo Page
 Fab 40: Luis Venegas, Publisher at wallpaper.com
 Bold Crossings of the Gender Line at nytimes.com
 Insiders | Luis Venegas at anothermag.com
 Luis Venegas at home in Madrid at theselby.com
 Candy 4 at models.com
 Fashion's candyman Luis Venegas sounds off on fashion, trannies and the digital age of publishing!! at dirty-mag.com
 The Candy Magazine and Opening Ceremony monster party hosted by Chloe Sevigny and Terry Richardson at purple.fr
 Luis's Venegas Obsessions at industrie.nowmanifest.com
 Luis Venegas Mega Magazine Maker from Spain Likes Them Young at buttmagazine.com
 Luis Venegas is a Geek at vice.com
 I Want Candy at dazeddigital.com
 Fanzine Fare at style.com
 Now Eulogizing | Fanzine 137 at tmagazine.blogs.nytimes.com
 Chronic Youth at tmagazine.blogs.nytimes.com
 YCE: Luis Venegas at dazeddigital.com

Spanish magazine publishers (people)
Living people
1979 births